Marine Light Attack Helicopter Squadron 467 (HMLA-467) was a United States Marine Corps helicopter squadron consisting of AH-1W SuperCobra attack helicopters and UH-1Y Venom utility helicopters. The squadron, nicknamed the "Sabers", was based at Marine Corps Air Station New River, North Carolina and was under the command of Marine Aircraft Group 29 (MAG-29) and the 2nd Marine Aircraft Wing (2nd MAW).  The squadron's aircraft markings are grey & white stripes on the aircraft tail to replicate the tail markings on a Diamondback Rattlesnake and the markings on the lighthouses in North Carolina.

The stand-up of HMLA-467 was part of the Commandant's plan to “grow the force” to better meet the demands of the Long War and the complexities of an evolving global threat.  They were activated in October 2008.

Mission
Support the Marine Air-Ground Task Force commander by providing offensive air support, utility support, armed escort and airborne supporting arms coordination, day or night under all weather conditions during expeditionary, joint or combined operations.

History

HMLA-467 began as a cadre in April 2008, and began to stand up using aircraft from the reserve squadron HMLA-775. During September 2008, pilots and aircrew from HMLA-467 received their first aircraft from HMLA-775 and flew them to MCAS Cherry Point for the squadron's activation ceremony on October 23, 2008, becoming the first HMLA to be activated in 37 years. Fifteen weeks later, in January, HMLA-467 supported Marine Aircraft Group 31 at Exercise Southern Fury.
 
During the months of September and October 2009, the Sabers supported Enhanced Mojave Viper (EMV) at Marine Corps Air Ground Combat Center Twentynine Palms.  During this exercise the Sabers executed day/night close air support, FAC(A), Escort, Command and Control, SCAR/AR, and weapons delivery training, flying 74 total sorties. During Mojave Viper, on October 1, the one-year anniversary of the squadron, HMLA-467 reached Full Operational Capability (FOC).

In January 2010, a detachment of UH-1N Hueys deployed with HMH-461 as part of the 22nd Marine Expeditionary Unit in order to provide humanitarian assistance and disaster response in support of Operation Unified Response following the 2010 Haiti earthquake.  In 2010 HMLA-467 Det A attached to the 26th Marine Expeditionary Unit and supported HADR operations in Pakistan as well as combat operations in Afghanistan and Libya.  In 2011 HMLA-467 Det B was the first east coast HMLA to support the 31st Marine Expeditionary Unit attaching to HMM-265 (REIN) and supporting exercises such as PHIBLEX.

As a result of force structure reductions, HMLA-467 was deactivated on June 16, 2016.

Gallery

Unit Awards
A unit citation or commendation is an award bestowed upon an organization for the action cited. Members of the unit who participated in said actions are allowed to wear on their uniforms the awarded unit citation. HMLA-467 has been presented with the following awards:

See also

 United States Marine Corps Aviation
 List of active United States Marine Corps aircraft squadrons
 List of decommissioned United States Marine Corps aircraft squadrons

References

External links

LA467